William Forrester (1869 – after 1892) was an English footballer who played in the Football League for Stoke.

Career
Forrester was born in Stoke-upon-Trent and played for Hanley Town before joining Stoke in 1891. He played one match in the Football League which came in a 3–0 defeat to Accrington during the 1891–92 season where he played in place of the injured Billy Dunn. He was released soon after and re-joined Hanley Town.

Career statistics

References

English footballers
Stoke City F.C. players
English Football League players
1869 births
Year of death missing
Association football outside forwards